The NAIA Women's Tennis Championship is the annual tournament to determine the national champions of women's NAIA collegiate tennis in the United States and Canada. Held annually since 1981, three separate championships are contested each year: team, singles, and doubles.

The most successful program are Auburn–Montgomery, with 14 NAIA national titles.

The current champions are Georgia Gwinnett, who won their fifth national title in 2019.

Results

Singles, Doubles, and Team titles (1981–1999)

Team title only (2000–present)

Champions

Team titles

Singles titles

Doubles titles

 Schools highlighted in pink are closed or no longer sponsor athletics.
 Schools highlight in yellow have reclassified athletics from the NAIA.

See also
NAIA Men's Tennis Championship
NCAA Women's Tennis Championships (Division I, Division II, Division III)
NCAA Men's Tennis Championships (Division I, Division II, Division III)

References

External links
NAIA Women's Tennis

Tennis women's
Tennis tournaments in the United States
College tennis in the United States
College women's tennis in the United States